Rovia (Greek: Ρόβια) is a little mountain village in the municipal unit of Andritsaina, Elis, Greece. In 2011 its population was 37. Rovia is situated on a mountain slope, 2 km southeast of Karmio, 3 km southwest of Theisoa and 3 km east of Andritsaina.

Population

See also 

List of settlements in Elis

References

Andritsaina
Populated places in Elis